Kerekes is a Hungarian-language surname and Jewish (from Hungary): metonymic occupational name for a wheelwright, from kerék 'wheel' a derivative of kerek 'round'. It may be phonetically transcribed into other languages as "Kerekeš", "Kerekesh", "Chiricheș" or "קרקש".

Notable people with the surname include:

Attila Kerekes (born 1954), Hungarian footballer
Gréta Kerekes (born 1992), Hungarian hurdles
Ljubomir Kerekeš (born 1960), Croatian theatre, television and film actor
Vica Kerekes (born 1981), Slovak actress
Zsolt Kerekes (born c. 1972), Hungarian skater
Zsombor Kerekes (born 1973), Hungarian footballer
Mat Kerekes (born 1994), American singer and songwriter
Peter Kerekes (born 1973), Slovak film director and writer
Katarína Kerekesová (born 1974), Slovak film director, writer and producer
Éva Kerekes (born 1966), Hungarian actress
József Kerekes (born 1962), Hungarian actor
Zsigmond Kerekes (1897-1973), Israeli architect
Viktória Kerekes (born 1970), Hungarian actress
János Kerekes (1913-1996), Hungarian composer

References

Hungarian-language surnames